The Computer Aided Surgery is a scientific journal covering all aspects of Computer-assisted surgery (CAS), a surgical concept and set of methods, that use computer technology for presurgical planning, and for guiding or performing surgical interventions.

The International Society for Computer Aided Surgery (ISCAS) is involved in the publication of the Journal.

References

External links 
 The Journal at the website of  ISCAS

Computer science journals
Biomedical informatics journals
Surgery journals
English-language journals
Computer-assisted surgery